Saint-Raphaël is a commune in the Dordogne department in Nouvelle-Aquitaine, France.

Population

See also
Communes of the Dordogne department

References

Communes of Dordogne
Arrondissement of Périgueux
Dordogne communes articles needing translation from French Wikipedia